Cycling at the Central American and Caribbean Games may refer to:

 Cycling at the 1998 Central American and Caribbean Games
 Cycling at the 2002 Central American and Caribbean Games
 Cycling at the 2006 Central American and Caribbean Games
 Cycling at the 2010 Central American and Caribbean Games
 Cycling at the 2014 Central American and Caribbean Games
 Cycling at the 2018 Central American and Caribbean Games